Hilde Rens (3 March 1972 – 25 June 2009), better known by her stage name Yasmine, was a Belgian singer, presenter and television personality.

Career

Music
Rens became known as a singer during the 1980s. At the age of 17, Yasmine made her television debut in 1989 as a contestant on a Flemish television talent show, performing a rendition of "Don't Cry for Me Argentina" as Julie Covington.

Two years later, she earned a record deal, releasing her first single, "Wie Denk Jij Wel Dat Je Bent" and her first album, Mooi zo in the same year. She went on to record another five mainstream pop albums before releasing Vandaag (Het morgen van gisteren) in 2004, a critically lauded CD of Leonard Cohen songs translated into Dutch.

Her last album, Licht Ontvlambaar, was released in 2006.

Broadcasting
Up until her death, Yasmine was a regular on the VRT's main television station, één, where she was an in-vision continuity announcer and a presenter for various entertainment shows including De Rode Loper, Memento and Zo is er maar één.

Prior to joining the VRT, she presented music programmes and was part of the promotion team for commercial station VTM during the 1990s and was one of the launch VJs for TMF Flanders. She was also a presenter for two VRT radio stations - Studio Brussel and the now-defunct pop station Donna.

Personal life and death
Rens came out as a lesbian in 1996, becoming an established LGBT icon for Flemish and Dutch youth.

Yasmine further positioned herself as a leading LGBT icon by marrying television personality Marianne Dupon (winner of the reality TV show De Mol) in 2003, following a 2-year relationship. On 9 March 2007, Dupon gave birth to a daughter named Ella-Louise.

The couple divorced in April 2009. On 25 June 2009, Yasmine's body was found near her sister's home in Kontich where she had hanged herself from a tree - her suicide reportedly followed a severe depression allegedly inflicted by her split with Dupon.

Discography

Albums
1991: Mooi Zo
1993: Als Jij Dat Wil
1995: Portfolio
1997: Prêt-a-Porter
1999: Blauw
2001: Yasmine
2004: Vandaag, Het Morgen Van Gisteren
2006: Licht Ontvlambaar

References
Based on a translation from French Wikipedia

External links
The Belgian Pop and Rock Archives - Yasmine profile

1972 births
2009 suicides
20th-century Belgian women singers
20th-century Belgian singers
Belgian women radio presenters
Belgian women television presenters
Dutch-language singers of Belgium
Flemish television presenters
Belgian lesbian musicians
Belgian LGBT singers
Belgian LGBT broadcasters
Lesbian singers
Musicians from Antwerp
Radio and television announcers
Suicides by hanging in Belgium
Mass media people from Antwerp
20th-century Belgian LGBT people
21st-century Belgian LGBT people